Bueno may refer to:

Places
Bueno Brandão, a municipality in Brazil
Bueno River, in Chile
Río Bueno, Chile, a city and commune
Rio Bueno (Jamaica), a river
Rio Bueno, Jamaica, a settlement
Pimenta Bueno, a municipality in Brazil
Pimenta Bueno River, a river in Brazil

Other
Bueno (surname)
Kinder Bueno, an Italian chocolate bar
Poco Bueno, an American Quarter Horse stallion
Taco Bueno, a U.S.-based fast-food restaurant chain
Bueno (footballer) (born 1995), Wellington Daniel Bueno, Brazilian footballer